Harri Morris is a Scottish rugby union player for Edinburgh in the Pro14. Morris' primary position is flanker.

Rugby Union career

Early life

Morris began playing rugby with Southport RFC in England, before moving to Scotland aged 15.

Professional career
Morris was announced in Edinburgh's squad ahead of their Round 4 Pro14 Rainbow Cup match against . He made his Pro14 debut in the same match, coming on as a replacement.

External links
Ultimate Rugby Profile

References

Living people
Scottish rugby union players
Edinburgh Rugby players
Rugby union flankers
Year of birth missing (living people)